Jayne Mansfield's Car is a 2012 drama film directed by Billy Bob Thornton, marking his first fiction directing job since 2000's All the Pretty Horses. Thornton also stars alongside Robert Duvall, John Hurt, Kevin Bacon, Ray Stevenson, Frances O'Connor, Ron White, and Robert Patrick. The film had its world premiere at the 62nd Berlin International Film Festival in February 2012. The film was released in limited release on September 13, 2013.

One of the locations in which the movie was shot is Cedartown, Georgia, USA. Exterior home shots were filmed in Troup County, Georgia, while additional scenes were shot in Decatur, Georgia. For the Greek Revival home, the interior shots were filmed at The Bailey-Tebault House located in Griffin, Georgia.

Plot
The film is set in 1969 Morrison, Alabama. The Caldwell family includes three World War II veterans, their sister Donna, and a patriarch, Jim, who is a World War I veteran. The Caldwells are involved in a cultural clash with the Bedfords, a family which includes Phillip, a World War II veteran, his sister Camilla, and their father Kingsley, also a World War I veteran.

The Bedfords are a London family in Morrison for the funeral of Kingsley's wife, who is the ex-wife of Jim Caldwell and the mother of Caldwell's children. Duvall described the film in an interview as "putting Tennessee Williams in the back seat".

The film's title refers to the automobile in which movie star Jayne Mansfield was supposedly decapitated in 1967. When a nearby town has a side show displaying the vehicle, Jim Caldwell takes Kingsley Bedford along to gawk at the grisly artifact.

Cast

Reception
The website's consensus reads, "Jayne Mansfield's Car assembles an impressive number of talented actors, but the screenplay — co-written by director and star Billy Bob Thornton — never gives them much of anything to do." Metacritic gives the film a weighted average score of 48 out of 100, based on 18 reviews, indicating "mixed or average reviews".

Lou Lumenick of the New York Post gave credit to the film's "star-laden" cast, commending the presences of Duvall, Hurt and Thornton but was critical of its "overlong" runtime. PopMatters contributor J.C. Macek III found criticism in Thornton's unfocused direction of the multiple stories and the screenplay being more suited for a mini-series than a condensed two hour film filled with vignettes. He did however give praise to the performances for adding substance to their given arcs, singling out Bacon, O'Connor and White as the highlights. Norm Schrager from Paste commended Thornton's direction for bringing out great performances from the cast and his scenes having competent execution but felt the film overall suffered from "a distinctive lack of cohesiveness" throughout the script in its handling of plot concepts and themes, concluding that: "[T]here's something here. It just needs a clearer road to travel." Alonso Duralde of TheWrap also voiced problems with Thornton and Epperson's screenplay, calling it "too sprawling and [too] tidy" with its generational family drama and misuse of plot devices towards the third act. Claudia Puig of USA Today felt the familial themes were elevated by "intriguingly impressionistic cinematography and a strong ensemble cast", but criticized the characterization of both families for containing stereotypical rednecks and stuffy aristocrats that conduct "tedious monologues and theatrical speechifying" and the misuse of the film's title for lacking "insight and depth." She concluded that: "Self-indulgent, heavy-handed and lumbering, Jayne Mansfield's Car is not a wreck, but it's certainly a vehicle for boredom."

References

External links
 
 
 
 

2012 films
2012 drama films
2010s American films
2010s English-language films
American drama films
Films directed by Billy Bob Thornton
Films set in 1969
Films set in Alabama
Films set in the 1960s
Films shot in Georgia (U.S. state)
Jayne Mansfield